Mary Heaviside Love (June 25, 1806 – November 2, 1874), also known as Lady Mary Love and  Mary Love, was a Canadian artist active from 1825 to 1842. Her lithograph A view on the St. Croix River, New Brunswick, circa 1830, was possibly the first lithograph made in Canada.  She was one of the first Canadian artists to go abroad for her studies.

Biography 
Love was born Mary Heaviside on June 25, 1806 to parents Thomas and Elizabeth Heaviside. She was the youngest of the Heaviside children. There is some scholarly debate about whether she was born in Saint John, New Brunswick or Halifax, Nova Scotia. In 1819, Love's sister, Anna Maria Heaviside, married clergyman Robert Willis. Another of Love's sisters, Jane, married Alexander Wedderburn in 1923.

Love studied art in England in the 1820s and was one of the first Canadian artists to pursue artistic studies abroad. On July 16, 1825, Mary married Lieutenant-Colonel James Frederick Love in New Brunswick. After her marriage, Mary developed her skills in drawing and watercolour. Henry James Morgan remarked that he would like to have Love's watercolours of the Eastern Townships published. The 1960 New Brunswick Museum Art Bulletin described Love's lithographs A view near St. Andrews, New Brunswick (Chamcook) and A view on the St. Croix River, New Brunswick as likely being the first drawn-on-stone lithographs in Canada.

In 1856, her husband was knighted. As a result of his title, Love officially became Lady Mary Love. The Loves travelled to London where James Love died in 1866. The two had no children. Little is known of Mary Love's life after the death of her husband. Love died at Cranley Place, London, England in 1874.

Works 

 A view near St. Andrews, New Brunswick (Chamcook) — drawn on stone, lithographed by John B. Pendleton in 1830
 A view on the St. Croix River, New Brunswick — drawn on stone, lithographed by John B. Pendleton in 1830
 Illustrations in The British Dominions in North America (2 vols., London, 1832) by Joseph Bouchette
New Government House, Fredericton, N.B. — signed "By a Lady" but generally considered to be Love's work
Barracks and Market Square, Fredericton, N.B. — signed "By a Lady" but generally considered to be Love's work

Works of uncertain attribution:

 Illustrations for A Peep at the Esquimaux (1825 book of poems)
On the Kennebeckasis near St. John in Bouchette's The British Dominions in North America

References

19th-century Canadian women artists
1806 births
1874 deaths